The 2010 Copa Petrobras Bogotá was a professional tennis tournament played on outdoor clay courts. It was the seventh edition of the tournament which is part of the 2010 ATP Challenger Tour. It took place in Bogotá, Colombia between 20 and 26 September 2010.

ATP entrants

Seeds

 Rankings are as of September 13, 2010.

Other entrants
The following players received wildcards into the singles main draw:
  Juan Sebastián Gómez
  Alejandro González
  José Pereira
  Sebastián Serrano

The following players received an entry as a special exempt into the singles main draw:
  Rodrigo Guidolin

The following players received entry from the qualifying draw:
  Diego Álvarez
  Martin Emmrich
  Gero Kretschmer
  Eládio Ribeiro Neto

Champions

Singles

 João Souza def.  Reda El Amrani, 6–4, 7–6(5)

Doubles

 Franco Ferreiro /  André Sá def.  Gero Kretschmer /  Alex Satschko, 7–6(6), 6–4

References
Official website
ITF search 
2010 Draws

Copa Petrobras Bogota
Tennis tournaments in Colombia
Clay court tennis tournaments
Copa Petrobras Bogotá
2010 in Colombian tennis